Delta class may refer to:

 Delta-class submarine Soviet designations Project 667B "Murena", Project 667BD "Murena-M", Project 667BDR "Kalmar", Project 667BDRM "Delfin"; NATO reporting names Delta I, Delta II, Delta III, Delta IV respectively), a series of third generation nuclear-powered ballistic missile submarines of the Soviet Navy.
 Delta-class repair ship, a variant of the U.S. Navy MARCOM Type C3-class ship
 MEKO Delta-class frigate, an alternative name for the MEKO D frigate design which would evolve into the MEKO 200 family
 Virgin Galactic Delta-class spacecraft, the followup suborbital spaceship to SpaceShipIII-class spacecraft
 Delta-class Payload Assist Module (PAM-D), a U.S. satellite launch upper-stage rocket
 Delta-class locomotive; see Egyptian Delta Light Railways
 Nordex Delta-class windmill electric power turbine
 Delta-class strike fighter, a fictional spaceship from Metroid; see Characters in the Metroid series

See also

 SPAP class Δ (Vulcan) (SPAP class delta) locomotive
 Delta (disambiguation)
 Class (disambiguation)
 Class 4 (disambiguation)
 Fourth class